Banasura Sagar Dam, which impounds the Karamanathodu tributary of the Kabini River, is part of the Indian Banasurasagar Project consisting of a dam and a canal project started in 1979. The goal of the project is to support the Kakkayam Hydro electric power project and satisfy the demand for irrigation and drinking water in a region known to have water shortages in seasonal dry periods. The dam is also known as Kuttiyadi Augmentation Main Earthen Dam.

In the dam's reservoir there is a set of islands that were formed when the reservoir submerged the surrounding areas. The islands with the Banasura hills are in the background view. It is the largest earth dam in India and the second largest of its kind in Asia. The dam is made up of massive stacks of stones and boulders.

The Kuttiyadi Augmentation Scheme consists of a main dam known as Banasurasagar Dam, an earth fill dam and a concrete gravity spillway dam and six saddle dams namely, a) Kosani ( Earth fill dam) 13.8 m high b) Near Kottagiri ( Earth fill dam) 11.0 m high c) Kottagiri ( Earth fill dam) 14.5 m high d) Kuttiyadi ( Concrete dam) 16.5 m high e) Nayanmoola ( Earth fill dam) 3.5 m high f)   Manjoora ( Earth fill dam) 4.0 m high. All the dams, except Kuttiady saddle, are earth fill dams. The Kuttiyadi saddle dam is a concrete dam. The spillway is located adjacent to the main dam at the right bank of the original river course. The water spread area at FRL / MWL is 12.77 km2. The catchment area of Banasurasagar Dam is 61.44 km2.

Specifications

Location
Latitude:11⁰40’15”N
Longitude:75⁰57’21”E
Panchayath : Padinjarathara
 Village : Padinjarathara
District : Wayanad
 River Basin : Kabani
River : Karamanthodu, a tributary of Kabani river
Release from Dam to river : Karamanthodu
Taluk through which release flows : Vythiri, Mananthavadi
Year of completion : 2004
 Name of Project : Kuttiady Augmentation Scheme
Purposeof Project : Multi purpose

Type of Dam : Homogeneous rolled earth fill
Classification : HH ( High Height)
 Maximum Water Level (MWL) : EL 775.60 m
Full Reservoir Level ( FRL) : EL 775.60 m
 Storage at FRL : 209.25 Mm3
 Height from deepest foundation : 38.5 m ( Height from bed level)
Length : 685.00 m
Spillway : No spillway
Crest Level : NA
 River Outlet : Nil
Officers in charge & phone No. :
Executive Engineer, Dam Safety Division No. V, Thariode, PIN- 673122 Phone – 9446008415
Assistant Executive Engineer, Dam Safety Sub Division, Thariode PIN- 673122 Phone- 9496004480
Installed capacity of the Project : 231.75 MW
Project Identification Code ( PIC) : KL29HH0044

Location
The Banasura Sagar Dam is located 21 km from Kalpetta, in Wayanad District of Kerala in the Western Ghats. It is the largest earthen dam in India and the second largest in Asia and a starting point for hikes into the surrounding mountains. It is an important tourist attraction. Banasura Sagar Dam is at the foot of the Banasura Hill.

Spillway Dam

Kuttiady Augmentation Spillway dam is a concrete dam with spillways for the Banasurasagar (kutyadi Augmentation) reservoir. The Spillway dam is part of the Kuttiyadi Augmentation Scheme which is located in Wayanad district. It aims at utilizing water of the Karamanthodu River, a tributary of Kabani River. The Scheme consists of a main dam known as Banasurasagar Dam an earth fill dam and a concrete gravity spillway dam and six saddle dams.

Reservoir

The Gross Storage of Kuttiyadi Augmentation (Banasura sagar) Reservoir is 209 Mm3 and live storage 185 Mm3. The water stored in the reservoir is diverted to the reservoir of Kuttiyadi Hydro Electric Project through an interconnecting tunnel. The sill level of diversion tunnel at inlet is 750.83 m. The size and shape of tunnel is varying. It is varying from 2.35 m dia. circular lined tunnel for a length of 890m &2.85 m D shaped unlined tunnel for a length of 3873 m. Maximum diversion is11.6 m3/s. The diverted water is used for power generation from Kuttiyadi Power Station. FRL of the reservoir is 775.60 m. Top level of dam is 778.50 m. There are four radial gates, each of size 10.97 m x 9.20 m. Crest level of spillway is 767.00 m. Spillway capacity is 1664 m3/s. One lower level outlet is provided in the spillway structure at750.75 m of size 1.10 m X 1.75 m to release irrigation requirement.

Etymology
The Banasura Sagar Dam is named after Banasura, the son of Mahabali who as per local Hindu mythological belief was a very respected king of Kerala.

Tourism
The dam has become a popular tourist destination. Many people visit the place to go trekking at the Banasura Hill & speed boating at Banasura Sagar Dam. The Banasura Hill Resort, located about 20 km from the dam was rated as Asia's largest Earthen Resort by BBC. Speed & pedal boats are available & are major hits with tourists. Speed boat ride, in particular, is an exhilarating experience & not to be missed.

Gallery

Current Scenario 
The actual missions for this dam is to provide water for Kakkayam reservoir which is situated in Kozhikode district to produce electricity and also irrigation in Wayanad, both the missions were not accomplished and currently it is a part of the Hydel project.
It has India's first Solar Atop Dam.

See also
List of dams and reservoirs in India

References

External links

 Government of Kerala Tenth Five Year Plan 2002-07 Report of the Working Group on 'Water Resources & Environment - Approach, Policies and Reforms' (PDF)
 Official Web Site of Wayanad District 

Dams in Kerala
Buildings and structures in Wayanad district
Geography of Wayanad district
Dams on the Kaveri River
1979 establishments in Kerala